Robbins's yellow bat (Scotophilus nucella) is a species of vesper bat. It is found in Ivory Coast, Ghana, and Uganda.

References

Scotophilus
Taxonomy articles created by Polbot
Mammals described in 1984
Bats of Africa